The 2016 MFF  Charity Cup is the 5th MFF Charity Cup, an annual Myanmar football match played between the winners of the previous season's Myanmar National League and 2015 General Aung San Shield. The match was contested by Ayeyawady United, the 2015 General Aung San Shield winners, and Yangon United, champions of the 2015 Myanmar National League. It is held at Aung San Stadium on 3 January 2016.

This was Yangon United's 3rd Cup appearance and Ayeyawady United's 3rd.

Background and pre-match

Yangon United qualified for the 2016 MFF Charity Cup as winners of the 2015 Myanmar National League. It was the club's fourth league title in 6 years. The other Charity Cup place went to Ayeyawady United, who defeated Yadanarbon FC by two goals to win the 2015 General Aung San Shield Final and retain the trophy.
Yangon United made their fourth appearance in the Charity Cup; prior to this they won once (2013) and lost twice, most recently in 2014 against Kanbawza. By contrast, Ayeyawady United made their fourth Chairity Cup appearance, and won twice. They went into the match as holders of the Shield, having defeated Yadanarbon FC a year earlier. Both clubs had only twice met before in the Shield, when Ayeyawady United won by penalty(7-5) in 2012 and Yangon United won by one goal in 2013.

Match

Team selection
Yangon United's coach did not choose Aung Wai Phyo and Marcelo Fernandez. Yangon United F.C. choose Ayeyawady United F.C. former player Kyaw Min Oo in their first line-up.
Ayeyawady United Coach,U Kyaw Lwin did't take Aung Hein Kyaw and Sa Htet Naing Win.

Details

Statistics

References

See also
MNL
Ayeyawady United
MFF

MFF Charity Cup
2016 in Burmese football